Evgeny Igorevich Sivozhelez (born 6 August 1986) is a Russian male volleyball player. He plays with the Russia men's national volleyball team and won the gold medal at the 2013 Men's European Volleyball Championship. With his club Zenit Kazan he competed at the 2011 FIVB Volleyball Men's Club World Championship and 2012 FIVB Volleyball Men's Club World Championship.

Sporting achievements

Clubs

FIVB Club World Championship
  Betim 2011 – with Zenit Kazan
  Betim 2015 – with Zenit Kazan
  Betim 2016 – with Zenit Kazan

CEV Champions League
  2009/2010 – with Dynamo Moscow
  2012/2013 – with Zenit Kazan
  2012/2013 – with Zenit Kazan
  2014/2015 – with Zenit Kazan
  2015/2016 – with Zenit Kazan
  2016/2017 – with Zenit Kazan

National championships
 2009/2010  with Dynamo Moscow
 2011/2012  with Zenit Kazan
 2012/2013  with Zenit Kazan
 2013/2014  with Zenit Kazan
 2014/2015  with Zenit Kazan
 2015/2016  with Zenit Kazan

National trophies
 2008  Russian Cup, with Dynamo Moscow
 2008  Russian SuperCup, with Dynamo Moscow
 2009  Russian SuperCup, with Dynamo Moscow
 2011  Russian SuperCup, with Zenit Kazan
 2012  Russian Cup, with Zenit Kazan
 2012  Russian SuperCup, with Zenit Kazan
 2013  Russian Cup, with Zenit Kazan
 2014  Russian Cup, with Zenit Kazan
 2015  Russian Cup, with Zenit Kazan
 2015  Russian SuperCup, with Zenit Kazan
 2016  Russian Cup, with Zenit Kazan
 2016  Russian SuperCup, with Zenit Kazan

National team
 2005  U21 World Championship
 2009  World League
 2011  World Cup
 2011  Summer Universiade
 2013  World League
 2013  European Championship
 2013  Champions Cup

References

External links

 Evgeny Sivozhelez at the International Volleyball Federation
 

1986 births
Living people
Russian men's volleyball players
Place of birth missing (living people)
VC Zenit Saint Petersburg players
Universiade gold medalists for Russia
Universiade medalists in volleyball